Elections were held in the state of Western Australia on 14 December 1996 to elect all 57 members to the Legislative Assembly and all 34 members to the Legislative Council. The Liberal–National coalition government, led by Premier Richard Court, won a second term in office against the Labor Party, led by Opposition Leader Dr Geoff Gallop since 15 October 1996.

The election resulted in the Liberals winning an outright majority for the first time in Western Australia's history.  Although Court did not need the support of the Nationals, the coalition was retained.  Meanwhile, Labor attracted its lowest share of the primary vote since 1901.

Results

Legislative Assembly

|}

Notes:
 At the 1993 election, Liberal Party member Phillip Pendal won the South Perth seat, whilst Labor Party member Ernie Bridge won Kimberley. Both members resigned from their parties during the term of parliament, and won their seats as independents in 1996.

Legislative Council

|}

 In the Agricultural and South West regions, the Liberals and Nationals ran a joint ticket, and in Mining and Pastoral, they ran separately, with the Liberals attracting 18,635 of the 52,240 formal votes and the Nationals 5,087.

Seats changing hands

Post-election pendulum

See also
 Candidates of the 1996 Western Australian state election
 Members of the Western Australian Legislative Assembly, 1993–1996
 Members of the Western Australian Legislative Assembly, 1996–2001
 McGinty v Western Australia

References

Elections in Western Australia
1996 elections in Australia
1990s in Western Australia
December 1996 events in Australia